Dilnoza Bektemirova (born 3 April 1997) is an Uzbekistani footballer who plays as a defender for Women's Championship club Bunyodkor and the Uzbekistan women's national team.

International career
Bektemirova capped for Uzbekistan at senior level during the 2020 AFC Women's Olympic Qualifying Tournament.

See also
List of Uzbekistan women's international footballers

References 

1997 births
Living people
Uzbekistani women's footballers
Uzbekistan women's international footballers
Women's association football defenders
People from Xorazm Region
21st-century Uzbekistani women